Kelly Shane Brooks (born March 18, 1974), whose stage name was Shane Stockton, is a former American country music singer. He released one album, Stories I Could Tell, through Decca Records Nashville in 1998.

Biography
Kelly Shane Brooks was born in Breckenridge, Texas, United States. Recording as Shane Stockton, he released a single "What If I'm Right."  In June 1998, Decca released his only album, Stories I Could Tell. Kelly wrote every song on the album, with one being co-written. Kelly sang with Buck Owens in Bakersfield, California, at Buck Owens' birthday party. "What If I'm Right" peaked at number 54 on the country music charts, and the album's second single, "Gonna Have to Fall", reached number 51. One of his songs, "My Baby No Está Aquí No More", appeared on Garth Brooks's 2005 album The Lost Sessions. Kelly Brooks lost his recording contract in 1999 and has not recorded since. In 2001, this time going as Shane Brooks, Kelly became the pastor at Elgin Avenue Baptist Church in Lubbock, Texas, which later changed its name to Freedom Fellowship. Kelly remained there until 2010 when the church disbanded.

Kelly Brooks now resides in Granbury, Texas and pastors The Bridge Church of Granbury.

Discography

Albums

Singles

Music videos

References

1974 births
American country singer-songwriters
American male singer-songwriters
Living people
Singer-songwriters from Texas
Decca Records artists
People from Breckenridge, Texas
21st-century American singers
Country musicians from Texas
21st-century American male singers